Beaver Township is a township in Jefferson County, Pennsylvania, United States. The population was 498 at the 2010 census. It was named for Beaver Run, a stream which traverses the township from east to west.

Geography
Beaver Township is in western Jefferson County and is bordered to the west by Clarion County and a small portion of Armstrong County. Redbank Creek is the largest waterway, flowing southwesterly across the northwestern portion of the township. Little Sandy Creek forms the southern boundary of the township and flows west toward Redbank Creek. The entire township is located in the Allegheny River watershed.

The borough of Worthville borders the township to the southeast. There are several small, unincorporated communities in the township: Conifer, Heathville, Ohl, Pansy and Langville.

Demographics

As of the census of 2000, there were 544 people, 200 households, and 153 families residing in the township.  The population density was 25.2 people per square mile (9.7/km).  There were 234 housing units at an average density of 10.9/sq mi (4.2/km).  The racial makeup of the township was 98.71% White, 0.18% African American, 0.18% Native American, 0.37% Asian, and 0.55% from two or more races. Hispanic or Latino of any race were 0.18% of the population.

There were 200 households, out of which 38.5% had children under the age of 18 living with them, 69.0% were married couples living together, 4.5% had a female householder with no husband present, and 23.5% were non-families. 21.0% of all households were made up of individuals, and 10.0% had someone living alone who was 65 years of age or older.  The average household size was 2.72 and the average family size was 3.20.

In the township the population was spread out, with 29.2% under the age of 18, 7.4% from 18 to 24, 29.0% from 25 to 44, 20.4% from 45 to 64, and 14.0% who were 65 years of age or older.  The median age was 36 years. For every 100 females, there were 119.4 males.  For every 100 females age 18 and over, there were 105.9 males.

The median income for a household in the township was $30,000, and the median income for a family was $34,286. Males had a median income of $28,611 versus $22,083 for females. The per capita income for the township was $12,747.  About 9.2% of families and 14.3% of the population were below the poverty line, including 16.7% of those under age 18 and 14.3% of those age 65 or over.

References

Townships in Jefferson County, Pennsylvania
Townships in Pennsylvania